Christian Kraiger (born 11 August 1973) is an Austrian football manager and former footballer who played as a defender.

External links
 

1973 births
Living people
Austrian footballers
FC Red Bull Salzburg players
Grazer AK players
FC Braunau players
FC Admira Wacker Mödling players
Association football defenders